Cyperus pangorei is a species of sedge that is native to parts of Asia.

The species was first formally described by the botanist Christen Friis Rottbøll in 1773.

See also 
 List of Cyperus species

References 

pangorei
Taxa named by Christen Friis Rottbøll
Plants described in 1773
Flora of Assam (region)
Flora of Bangladesh
Flora of China
Flora of India
Flora of Myanmar
Flora of Nepal
Flora of Pakistan
Flora of Sri Lanka